Pumajolluni (possibly from Aymara puma cougar, puma, qullu mountain, -ni a suffix to indicate ownership, "the one with a cougar mountain") is a mountain in the Carabaya mountain range in the Andes of Peru at a lake of the same name. It is located in the Puno Region, Carabaya Province, on the border of the districts Ajoyani, Coasa and Ituata. It lies southwest of the mountain Chullumpirini.

References

Mountains of Peru
Mountains of Puno Region
Glaciers of Peru
Lakes of Puno Region
Lakes of Peru